Government of Bengal may refer to:

Government of Bangladesh
Government of East Bengal
Government of West Bengal

See also
Governor of Bengal, a British official from 1690 until Independence in 1947